South Knobs Township is one of twelve townships in Yadkin County, North Carolina, United States. The township had a population of 1,729 according to the 2000 census.

Geographically, South Knobs Township occupies  in western Yadkin County.  South Knobs Township's western border is with Wilkes County.  The township includes the unincorporated community of Swan Creek.

Townships in Yadkin County, North Carolina
Townships in North Carolina